Karolus is a genus of gastropods belonging to the family Ferussaciidae.

The species of this genus are found in America.

Species:

Karolus consobrinus 
Karolus iota

References

Ferussaciidae